...Like Cologne is a live EP release by American rock band Queens of the Stone Age. It was released on November 22, 2013, exclusively on Spotify.

The EP features live acoustic versions of three tracks, recorded on September 4, 2013 at the Kulturkirche in Cologne, Germany. The tracks include "Long Slow Goodbye", from 2005's Lullabies to Paralyze, and "The Vampyre of Time and Memory" and "I Sat by the Ocean" from 2013's ...Like Clockwork.

Track listing

Personnel
Josh Homme – vocals, guitar, piano
Troy Van Leeuwen – guitars, backing vocals, keyboards
Dean Fertita – keyboards, guitars, backing vocals, piano, church organ
Michael Shuman – bass, backing vocals
Jon Theodore – drums, percussion

References

External links

'...Like Cologne' on Matador Records official website 

2013 EPs
2013 live albums
Queens of the Stone Age albums
Matador Records EPs
Matador Records live albums